The province of West Nusa Tenggara in Indonesia is divided into regencies which are turn are divided administratively into districts (kecamatan).

The districts of West Nusa Tenggara, with the regency each falls into, are as follows:

 
West Nusa Tenggara